Farhad Rahbar (born 5 October 1959, in Semnan) is an Iranian economist, academic, president and member of board of trustees of the Islamic Azad University, full professor of interdisciplinary economics and the former Chancellor of the University of Tehran.

He received his BA, MA and Ph.D in Theoretical Economics from University of Tehran. 
Previously, Rahbar was a Vice President of Iran and head of Management and Planning Organisation of Iran. He has also worked as the Deputy for economic affairs at the Ministry of Intelligence.
From February 2008 until February 2014, he was the chancellor of University of Tehran.

References

See also
Economy of Iran
Higher education in Iran

1959 births
Living people
Iranian economists
People from Semnan, Iran
Academic staff of the University of Tehran
Deputies of the Ministry of Intelligence (Iran)
Chancellors of the University of Tehran
Popular Front of Islamic Revolution Forces politicians